Roman Ivanovych Meleshko (born 8 September 1971) is a former Ukrainian football player.

Honours
Dnipro Dnipropetrovsk
USSR Federation Cup winner: 1989
USSR Federation Cup runner-up: 1990

Dinamo Minsk
Belarusian Premier League champion: 1992–93

External links
 

1971 births
Living people
Footballers from Zaporizhzhia
Soviet footballers
Ukrainian footballers
Association football midfielders
Ukrainian expatriate footballers
Expatriate footballers in Belarus
Expatriate footballers in Russia
Russian Premier League players
Ukrainian Premier League players
FC Dnipro players
FC Metalurh Zaporizhzhia players
FC Baltika Kaliningrad players
FC Rechitsa-2014 players
FC Dinamo Minsk players
FC Spartak Vladikavkaz players
FC Slavia Mozyr players
FC Fandok Bobruisk players
FC Zorya Luhansk players
FC Lukhovitsy players